Sickles Corner is an unincorporated community and census-designated place (CDP) in Blair County, Pennsylvania, United States. It was first listed as a CDP prior to the 2020 census.

The CDP is in northeastern Blair County, in the southwestern part of Tyrone Township. It sits at the southwestern end of Sinking Creek Valley, between two arms of Brush Mountain, rising to the west and the southeast. Kettle Road is the main route through Sickles Corner: it leads northeastward , down the Sinking Creek Valley, to Pennsylvania Route 453 near the Little Juniata River, and southwestward through Elberta and a water gap in Brush Mountain  to Altoona.

References 

Census-designated places in Blair County, Pennsylvania
Census-designated places in Pennsylvania